Gustavo Adolfo Palma (31 August 1920 – 1 December 2009) was a Guatemalan singer, actor, and lyric tenor between 1936 and 1970, nicknamed "the Tenor of Central America" by Guatemalan radio personality José Flamenco y Cotero.

Early years 
Palma's parents were lawyer Cecilio Palma y Palma and Piedad Recinos. When he was seven years old, his family moved to Guatemala City. He soon began to sing in aficionado programs at the Theater "Abril".

Career 

Gustavo Adolfo Palma made his debut as a professional singer in 1936 with weekly songs on the broadcast radio station TGX. He was a regular singer on the radio during the golden age of Guatemala's state radio station  at the age of seventeen. At the age of 20, he was trained in singing by Martha Bolaños de Prado, an outstanding music teacher who led several singers to great success at that time.

In 1944, Palma participated in the contest "Trip to Mexico," promoted by Mexico's state radio station XEW, which was looking for "the Voice of Latin America"; Palma won first place and was awarded with a professional career in Mexico, where he signed a contract with XEW, shared the music scene with Jorge Negrete, and was accompanied by some of the best broadcast orchestras.

Returning to Guatemala in October 1944, he shared a stage with Pedro Vargas, in the glamorous Salon Granada, located in 6ª Avenue and 11 Street of zone 1 and in 1947, he shared a stage with Pedro Infante in Mansion Victoria of the City of Guatemala. In 1955, he acted in the film "El Cristo Negro" (the Black Christ) with the actors Raúl Martinez and Rosa Carmina. The movie filmed in Guatemala and directed and produced by Jose Baviera, of Spanish nationality. This one forms part of the List of Guatemalan films.

In 1956, he was named "most wanted artist", by popular vote, in a contest promoted by the newspaper Mundo Libre, a testimony to the public's esteem. He recorded with several recording houses of Mexico, as well as "Columbia Records" and "Musart Records". He recorded other Central American discography seals.

In 1964, he participated in the Central American Festival of the Song, in El Salvador, obtaining a prize for his song "Tonight, my Love", composed by Marco Tulio Cordón. In 1970, he was the guest of honor in the First Festival of the Central American and Caribbean Song in Panama. The event was carried out 23, 24 and 25 October . Palma interpreted the song "Contigo" ("With You") of his own inspiration, accompanied by an orchestra conducted by maestro Jorge Sarmiento. In this event he again shared the stage with Pedro Vargas.

Palma was artistically versatile, acting in television, radio, night clubs and theaters across the entire Republic. In Guatemala, he was accompanied by famous orchestras led by conductors such as Miguel Sandoval. In 1982, he was the protagonist of the festival "Broadway '82" performed in the Teatro Nacional of Guatemala, where he shared the stage with a then unknown Ricardo Arjona.

Palma also composed of some romantic songs and in 1976, he was the main protagonist of the photo soap opera called "Maria", acting with other Guatemalan singers, among them Elizabeth of Guatemala.

His last recording, called "Yesterday, Today and Always," was released in 1971.

See also

 Music of Guatemala

Notes and references

Notes

References

Bibliography

Bibliography

Further reading

External links
Gustavo Adolfo Palma: Contigo
Gustavo Adolfo Palma: El caminante del Mayab
Gustavo Adolfo Palma: Historia de amor
Gustavo Adolfo Palma: Mi amor es un gitano
Gustavo Adolfo Palma: Españolerías

Guatemalan male singer-songwriters
Guatemalan  male singers
Tenors
1920 births
2009 deaths
People from Jutiapa Department
20th-century Guatemalan people
20th-century male singers